The Kay K-161 ThinTwin is an electric guitar made from 1952 to 1959, was one of the longest produced guitars by Kay Musical Instrument Company. The K161 Thin-Twin was commonly referred to as the "Jimmy Reed" guitar. Introduced not long after Gibson's Les Paul, the ThinTwin was a semi-hollow body guitar and larger than its name "thin" implied. "ThinTwin" was a reference to the unique appearance of the dual pickups, having a very slim profile.

There was also a Silvertone-branded version of this guitar, with a slightly more 'regal' appointment in ts decorated pickguard and headstock logo, coupled with a deeply finished 'flamed' grain top and so-called 'sunburst' finish. Both the pickguard and the headstock's decorated laminate on early versions of this model sported a shield-type engraving and coloring, with later versions of the guitar losing the shield from the headstock of later models, but with the sky-blue-trimmed pickguard never losing the shield, which sat right in the middle of the strumming field. The earliest model of this guitar, the model #1381 had the shield device on both the pickguard and the headstock laminate. Later versions of that model would only have the gold filled free-form script "Silvertone' logo within an headstock edge-tracing blue border, much like the appearance in width and color of the blue line trimming the pickguard. The very last-produced of the 1381 guitars and into the versions sold as the model #1369, were topped with a thin metal script Silvertone set in a glossy black field.

Model 1381/1369 "Thin Twin" Manufactured by Kay was available from the Spring/Summer Sears catalog of 1954 through the Fall/Winter version going into early 1958. In the Spring/Summer catalog of 1957, the model number changed to 1369, and that number lasted until the retirement of the model in early 1958, being available in the Fall/Winter 1957 catalog.

Description of shield: A front view drawing of a crown ringed around the edge we can see with three fleur-de-lis-like tips. Across the face of the ring between the tips and the edge of the crown that would sit on the head when worn, are three round circles representing jewels. From left to right, the circles are colored red, blue, red. Under this drawing of a crown is a long shield just slightly narrower than the crown device. This shield is bisected from approximately 1/3 the way down on its right side, on a 45 degree angle line that has a width appropriate with extending the width of that line so as to reach the bottom third of the device on its left side. The fields this wide band separates are brown with a gold musical note within its borders on the top and bottom fields.

Started in 1890 and based in Chicago, Illinois, the Kay Musical Instrument Company introduced, in 1957, the Gold "K" line of guitars.  These included electric guitars as well as archtop and flattop acoustics.  Before then, the company's guitars had been known mostly for student and department store grade instruments. They made instruments for many companies under different names; "Old Kraftsman", "Airline" and "Silvertone" were just a few of them used.  They stopped making the "K" Gold line in 1962.  Kay had got Barney Kessel, the top guitarist in the late 1950s, to endorse three models (Jazz Special, Artist, and Pro) of the series. This only lasted for three years then Kessel left to join Gibson.

Electric guitars